Tony Elliott may refer to:
 Tony Elliott (publisher) (1947–2020), British founder and owner of the Time Out publishing company
 Tony Elliott (politician) (born 1944), Australian politician
 Tony Elliott (footballer) (born 1969), English football goalkeeper
 Tony Elliott (defensive lineman) (1959–2007), defensive lineman for the New Orleans Saints
 Tony Elliott (defensive back) (born 1964), defensive back for the Green Bay Packers
 Tony Elliott (American football coach) (born 1979), head American football coach for the University of Virginia